Gurkanwal Kaur is an Indian Politician from the state of Punjab. Kaur represented the Jalandhar Cantt Assembly Constituency from 2002 to 2007. Kaur was from the Indian National Congress but in 2017 she joined Bharatiya Janata Party in the presence of Union finance minister Arun Jaitley and Punjab BJP president, Vijay Sampla.

Family

Kaur's brother Tej Parkash Singh was a minister in the Punjab government and her father  Beant Singh was the Chief Minister of Punjab from 1992 to 1995.

See also 

 Political families of Punjab, India

References

Living people
Indian National Congress politicians from Punjab, India
People from Jalandhar
Bharatiya Janata Party politicians from Punjab
Punjab, India MLAs 2002–2007
Women members of the Punjab Legislative Assembly
21st-century Indian women politicians
21st-century Indian politicians
Year of birth missing (living people)